Guisando is a municipality located in the province of Ávila, Castile and León, Spain. According to the 2006 census (INE), the municipality had a population of 620 inhabitants.

The famous bulls of Guisando are actually not in the modern municipality but in neighbouring El Tiemblo.

References

Municipalities in the Province of Ávila